Malus ( or ) is a genus of about 30–55 species of small deciduous trees or shrubs in the family Rosaceae, including the domesticated orchard apple, crab apples, wild apples, and rainberries.

The genus is native to the temperate zone of the Northern Hemisphere.

Description

Apple trees are typically  talI at maturity, with a dense, twiggy crown. The flowers are borne in corymbs, and have five petals, which may be white, pink, or red, and are perfect, with usually red stamens that produce copious pollen, and a half-inferior ovary; flowering occurs in the spring after 50–80 growing degree days (varying greatly according to subspecies and cultivar).

Many apples require cross-pollination between individuals by insects (typically bees, which freely visit the flowers for both nectar and pollen); these are called self-sterile, so self-pollination is impossible, making pollinating insects essential.

A number of cultivars  are self-pollinating, such as 'Granny Smith' and 'Golden Delicious', but are considerably fewer in number compared to their cross-pollination dependent counterparts.

Several Malus species, including domestic apples, hybridize freely.

The centre of the fruit contains five carpels arranged star-like, each containing one or two seeds.

Subdivisions and species 
About 42 to 55 species and natural hybrids are known, with about 25 from China, of which 15 are endemic. The genus Malus is subdivided into eight sections (six, with two added in 2006 and 2008). The genus Docynia has been shown to be nested within Malus in molecular phylogenies. The oldest fossils of the genus date to the Eocene (Lutetian), which are leaves belonging to the species Malus collardii and Malus kingiensis from western North America (Idaho) and the Russian Far East (Kamchatka), respectively.

Natural hybrids

 Malus × micromalus – midget crabapple

Fossil species 
After
 Malus collardii Axelrod, North America (Idaho), Eocene
 Malus kingiensis Budants, Kamchatka Peninsula, Russia, Eocene
 Malus florissantensis (Cockerell) MacGinitie Green River Formation, North America (Colorado) Eocene
 Malus pseudocredneria (Cockerell) MacGinitie Green River Formation, North America (Colorado) Eocene
 Malus idahoensis R.W.Br. North America (Idaho), Miocene
 Malus parahupehensis J.Hsu and R.W.Chaney Shanwang, Shandong, China, Miocene
 Malus antiqua Doweld Romania, Pliocene
 Malus pseudoangustifolia E.W.Berry North America (South Carolina), Pleistocene

Cultivation 

Crabapples are popular as compact ornamental trees, providing blossom in spring and colourful fruit in autumn.  The fruits often persist throughout winter. Numerous hybrid cultivars have been selected.

Some crabapples are used as rootstocks for domestic apples to add beneficial characteristics. For example, the rootstocks of Malus baccata varieties are used to give additional cold hardiness to the combined plants for orchards in cold northern areas.

They are also used as pollinizers in apple orchards.  Varieties of crabapple are selected to bloom contemporaneously with the apple variety in an orchard planting, and the crabs are planted every sixth or seventh tree, or limbs of a crab tree are grafted onto some of the apple trees. In emergencies, a bucket or drum bouquet of crabapple flowering branches is placed near the beehives as orchard pollenizers.

Because of the plentiful blossoms and small fruit, crabapples are popular for use in bonsai culture.

Cultivars
These cultivars have won the Royal Horticultural Society's Award of Garden Merit:- 

'Adirondack' 
'Butterball' 
 'Comtesse de Paris'  
'Evereste' 
'Jelly King'='Mattfru' 
'Laura' 
Malus × robusta 'Red Sentinel' 
'Sun Rival'

Other varieties are dealt with under their species names.

Toxicity 
The seeds contain cyanide compounds.

Uses 
Crabapple fruit is not an important crop in most areas, being extremely sour due to malic acid (which like the genus derives from the Latin name mālum), and in some species woody, so is rarely eaten raw. In some Southeast Asian cultures, they are valued as a sour condiment, sometimes eaten with salt and chilli or shrimp paste.

Some crabapple varieties are an exception to the reputation of being sour, and can be very sweet, such as the 'Chestnut' cultivar.

Crabapples are an excellent source of pectin, and their juice can be made into a ruby-coloured preserve with a full, spicy flavour. A small percentage of crabapples in cider makes a more interesting flavour. As Old English Wergulu, the crab apple is one of the nine plants invoked in the pagan Anglo-Saxon Nine Herbs Charm, recorded in the 10th century.

Applewood gives off a pleasant scent when burned, and smoke from an applewood fire gives an excellent flavour to smoked foods. It is easier to cut when green; dry applewood is exceedingly difficult to carve by hand. It is a good wood for cooking fires because it burns hot and slow, without producing much flame. Applewood is used to make handles of hand saws; 2,000,000 board feet is used annually for this purpose.

Gallery

References

External links

 Germplasm Resources Information Network: Malus
 Flora of China: Malus
 Virginia Cooperative Extension - Disease resistant crabapples 
 The PRI disease resistant apple breeding program: a cooperative among Purdue University, Rutgers University, and the University of Illinois.

 
Rosaceae genera
Plants used in bonsai
Fruit trees
Taxa named by Philip Miller